The Mason–Stothers theorem, or simply Mason's theorem, is a mathematical theorem about polynomials, analogous to the abc conjecture for integers. It is named after Walter Wilson Stothers, who published it in 1981, and R. C. Mason, who rediscovered it shortly thereafter.

The theorem states:
Then

Examples

Over fields of characteristic  it is not enough to assume that they are not all constant.
Taking  and  gives an example where equality holds in the Mason–Stothers theorem, showing that the inequality is in some sense the best possible.

Proof
 gave the following elementary proof of the Mason–Stothers theorem.

Step 1. Write  for their common value.

Step 2.

Since these are coprime it is divisible by their product, and since  is nonzero we get

Step 4. Substituting in the inequalities
 − (number of distinct roots of )
 − (number of distinct roots of )
 − (number of distinct roots of )
(where the roots are taken in some algebraic closure) and

we find that

which is what we needed to prove.

Generalizations
There is a natural generalization in which the ring of polynomials is replaced by a one-dimensional function field.
Let  be an algebraically closed field of characteristic 0, let  be a smooth projective curve
of genus , let
 be rational functions on  satisfying ,
and let
Then

This was proved by Mason, with an alternative short proof published the same year by J. H. Silverman
.

There is a further generalization, due independently to J. F. Voloch
and to
W. D. Brownawell and D. W. Masser,
that gives an upper bound for  -variable -unit
equations  provided that
Under this assumption, they prove that

References

External links

Mason-Stothers Theorem and the ABC Conjecture, Vishal Lama. A cleaned-up version of the proof from Lang's book.

Theorems about polynomials